Débora Susan Sulca Cravero (born 1986 in Lima, Peru) is a Peruvian model, fashion blogger, and beauty pageant titleholder who won Miss Peru 2005 and represented Peru at the Miss Universe 2005 pageant where she was a Top 10 finalist.

Pageantry
At the age of 16, she began her career in modeling and moved to Europe to expand her early career. Three years later she returned to Peru to compete for her country's national beauty pageant by representing the department of Cajamarca. Cited as one of the favorites for the title due to her modeling experience overseas and mature oratory at a young age, she won the Miss Peru 2005 crown on the night of April 16th, 2005. She was the second representative of Cajamarca to win the title since María Isabel Frías in 1977. 

The following month, in May, she competed in the Miss Universe 2005 pageant held in Bangkok, Thailand, where she placed among the Top 10 finalists, ranking 6th overall. She became an instant crowd favorite among the thai people during the concentration. Her national costume was inspired in the Lord of Sipan. Sulca's placement was Peru's 16th in the history of the pageant.

External links
 

1986 births
Living people
Miss Universe 2005 contestants
People from Cajamarca Region
Peruvian beauty pageant winners
Peruvian female models
Peruvian child models